Chalmeh may refer to:
 Chalmeh, Ardabil (چالمه - Chalmeh)
 Chalmeh, Markazi (چالمه - Chalmeh)
 Chalmeh, Yazd (چالمه - Chālmeh)